Trayal Corporation is a company manufacturing tires, protective devices and industrial explosives based in Kruševac, Serbia.

History
Trayal Corporation was founded in 1889 in Kruševac as a "Gunpowder Works".

In 2006, the Government of Serbia sold 76.9% of shares of the company to the Bulgarian Brikel (owned by the businessman Hristo Kovachki) for a sum of 12.1 million euros, with the obligation to invest 25.1 million euros. At the time, Trayal Corporation had 3,500 employees in five divisions. However, over the years, most of the production was significantly reduced due to poor management.

In 2011, the American tire manufacturing company Cooper Tire & Rubber Company took automobile tire facilities of Trayal for a sum of 13 million euros. The newly established company which has disintegrated from the Trayal Corporation, was named "Cooper Tire & Rubber Company Serbia" d.o.o.

In 2013, the Government of Serbia took over the company's remaining assets, as it accumulated 130 million euros of debt and contract with the Bulgarian company was cancelled. In 2017, Trayal Corporation developed remotely-controlled anti-hail protection system used in agriculture.

As of 2018, "Trayal Corporation" is the largest employer in the city of Kruševac, with exports to the foreign markets.

Market
"Trayal Corporation" exports to the neighbouring Balkan countries, EU countries and the United States.

See also
 Automotive industry in Serbia
 Defense industry of Serbia
 FK Trayal Kruševac

References

External links
 

1889 establishments in Serbia
Companies based in Kruševac
Defense companies of Serbia
Defense industry of Serbia
Manufacturing companies established in 1889
Manufacturing companies of Serbia
Serbian brands
Tire manufacturers of Serbia